Katharine Long, Catharine Long or similar names may refer to:

Lady Catharine Long (1797–1867), English novelist and religious writer
Kathleen Long CBE (1896–1968), English pianist and teacher
Katherine Long (died 1969), English animal welfare activist, co-founder of Beauty Without Cruelty
Catherine Small Long (1924–2019), American congresswoman from Louisiana
Kate Long (storyteller), American journalist and radio/TV producer since 1981
Kate Long (born 1964), English author (The Bad Mother's Handbook)
Kathy Long (born 1964), American kickboxer, mixed martial arts fighter and actress
Kath Long, English environmental scientist, co-founder in 2010 of Well Grounded with Iola Leal Riesco
Kat Long (born 1974), American journalist, author and social historian
Catherine Crosby Long (born 1980), American beauty pageant winner, Miss Alabama 2003
Katie Long (born 1988), English field hockey forward